A Face in the Fog is a 1936 American film directed by Robert F. Hill.

Plot
June Collyer (her last film) plays a meddlesome reporter who claims she can recognize "the fiend" because she saw his face in the fog (in a mirror). She becomes his target. Fellow reporter (Lloyd Hughes) tries to protect her, along with a ditzy photographer (Al. St. John). After there is a murder in a theater, the playwright (Lawrence Gray) pitches in to help solve the case.

Cast
June Collyer as Jean Monroe
Lloyd Hughes as Frank Gordon
Lawrence Gray as Peter Fortune
Jack Mulhall as Reardon
Al St. John as Elmer
John Cowell as Wilson
John Elliott as Detective Davis
Sam Flint as Harrison - Newspaper Editor
Forrest Taylor as Bruce Cromwell
George Ball Trio as Acrobatic Trio
Ramsdall Dancers as Dance Troupe
Donna Lee Trio as Singers

References

External links

1936 films
American mystery films
American black-and-white films
Films based on American novels
1930s crime films
Victory Pictures films
American crime films
1930s mystery films
Films directed by Robert F. Hill
1930s English-language films
1930s American films